Gymnobathra rufopunctella is a species of moth in the family Oecophoridae. This species is in need of taxonomic revision and probably belongs to a separate genus. It is endemic to New Zealand. It has been classified as Data Deficient by the Department of Conservation.

Taxonomy 
This species was first described and illustrated by George Hudson in 1950 using specimens collected by Hudson at Days Bay and Wilton's Bush in Wellington. The lectotype is held at the Museum of New Zealand Te Papa. The genus level classification of this species is regarded as unsatisfactory. It is believed that this species closely resembles some members of the Barea group of genera.  As a result, the species is currently also known as Gymnobathra (s.l.) rufopunctella.

Description 
Hudson described this species as follows:

Distribution 
G. rufopunctella is endemic to New Zealand. This species has been collected in Wellington.

Biology and behaviour 
The adult moths are on the wing in November and December. The species prefers forest habitat.

Conservation status 
This species has been classified as having the "Data Deficient" conservation status under the New Zealand Threat Classification System.

References

External links
Image of holotype

Moths described in 1950
Oecophoridae
Moths of New Zealand
Endemic fauna of New Zealand
Taxa named by George Hudson
Endemic moths of New Zealand